Terje Krokstad (born 1 October 1956) is a former Norwegian biathlete

He hails from Krokstadøra in Snillfjord, and represented Krokstadøra IL. At the Winter Olympics he finished seventeenth in the 10 km sprint at the 1980 Winter Olympics, and eighteenth in the 10 km sprint at the 1984 Winter Olympics. His best international result is a bronze medal in the 20 km from the 1982 World Championships.

References

1956 births
Living people
People from Sør-Trøndelag
Norwegian male biathletes
Biathletes at the 1980 Winter Olympics
Biathletes at the 1984 Winter Olympics
Olympic biathletes of Norway
Biathlon World Championships medalists
Sportspeople from Trøndelag